The Bundesgymnasium und Bundesrealgymnasium Bludenz (or simply: BG und BRG Bludenz) is an academic high school, located in Bludenz in Austria in its westernmost federal state Vorarlberg.

References

Gymnasiums in Austria